One for All is the fifth and final solo studio album by former Kiss drummer and vocalist Peter Criss, released through Megaforce Records on July 23, 2007. It reached #36 on the Billboard Top Independent Album list. A special hand-signed gold label version was released that day at Best Buy stores in limited quantities.

In his autobiography, Makeup to Breakup: My Life In and Out of Kiss, Criss mentioned that the song "Space Ace" was written about his Kiss bandmate Ace Frehley. He wrote, "I even wrote a song about Ace for the album, "Space Ace". You might think it was a tribute, but I was really writing about Ace’s betrayal of me."

Track listing
"One for All" – (Mike McLaughlin, Peter Criss) 4:47 
"Doesn't Get Better Than This" (Charles Kipps, McLaughlin, Criss) – 5:08
"Last Night" – (McLaughlin, Criss) 4:27 
"What a Difference a Day Makes" (Stanley Adams, María Grever) – 4:25
"Hope" – (McLaughlin, Criss) 2:47
"Faces in the Crowd" – (McLaughlin, Criss) 3:36
"Send in the Clowns" (Stephen Sondheim) – 3:52
"Falling All Over Again" – (McLaughlin, Criss) 4:42
"Whisper" – (McLaughlin, Criss) 4:16
"Heart Behind These Hands" (Mark Schoenfeld, Barri McPherson) – 3:39
"Memories" – (McLaughlin, Criss) 3:48
"Space Ace" (Criss, Mark Montague) – 5:10

Personnel

Musicians
 Peter Criss – lead vocals, drums, percussion, art direction, design
 Will Lee – bass
 Mark Montague – bass, vocals
 Mike McLaughlin – guitar, vocals
 Paul Shaffer – keyboards
 Clifford Carter – keyboards arranger
 All Boys Choir and Jen Johnson – backing vocals

Technical
 Douglas Heusser – design
 Tom Perkins – engineer
 Chris Jennings, Reed Taylor – assistant engineers
 George Marino – mastering
 Eric Stephen Jacobs – photography

Charts

References

2007 albums
Peter Criss albums
Megaforce Records albums